Events in the year 1980 in Germany.

Incumbents
President – Karl Carstens (West Germany)
Chancellor – Helmut Schmidt (West Germany)
General Secretary – Erich Honecker (East Germany)
Prime Minister – Willi Stoph (East Germany)

Events 
 18 to 29 February - 30th Berlin International Film Festival
 20 March - Germany participated in the Eurovision Song Contest 1980, held in The Hague.
 26 September - Oktoberfest bombing
 5 October - West German federal election, 1980
 6 November - The Third Schmidt cabinet led by Helmut Schmidt was sworn in.
unknown date - First modern guided bus opens in Essen.

Births
 February 2 - Angela Finger-Erben, German journalist
 February 22 - Jeanette Biedermann, German singer
 February 28 - Stefan Konarske, German actor
 March 9 - Volker Bruch, German television actor
 March 18 - Juliette Schoppmann, German singer
 March 25 - Hanno Koffler, German actor
 May 2 - Tim Borowski, German footballer
 May 6 - Wolke Hegenbarth, German actress
 May 9 - Carolin Kebekus, German comedian
 May 16 - Jens Spahn, German politician
 June 13 - Sarah Connor, German singer
 June 16 - Sibel Kekilli, German actress
 July 4 - Fahri Yardım, German actor
 July 9 - Sebastian Sylvester, German boxer
 August 6 - Roman Weidenfeller, German football player
 August 28 - Petra Schmidt-Schaller, German actress
 December 4 - Stefan Pfannmöller, German canoeist
 December 29 - Yvonne Bönisch, German judoka

Deaths
 27 January - Rudolf Christoph Freiherr von Gersdorff, officer in the German Army. He attempted to assassinate Adolf Hitler by suicide bombing on 21 March 1943; (born 1905)
 February 6 — Bernhard Eichhorn, German film composer (born 1904)
 February 6 — Franz Schafheitlin, German actor (born 1895)
 February 21 — Alfred Andersch, German writer (born 1914)
 March 5 —  Wilhelm Hoegner, German politician (born 1887)
 April 22 — August von Finck Sr., German banker (born 1898)
 June 8  —  Ernst Busch, German actor and singer (born 1900)
 June 27 — Walter Dornberger, German Army artillery officer whose career spanned World War I and World War II. He was a leader of Nazi Germany's V-2 rocket program (born 1895)
 September 3 - Fabian von Schlabrendorff, German jurist, soldier, and member of the resistance against Adolf Hitler (born 1907)
 October 18 - Hans Ehard, German politician (born 1887)
 December 11 — Princess Victoria Louise of Prussia, German noblewoman (born 1892)
 December 24 — Karl Dönitz , German admiral who played a major role in the naval history of World War II (born 1891)

See also
1980 in German television

References

 
Years of the 20th century in Germany